Rosen Vasilev (born 12 February 1966) is a Bulgarian wrestler. He competed in the men's freestyle 62 kg at the 1992 Summer Olympics.

References

1966 births
Living people
Bulgarian male sport wrestlers
Olympic wrestlers of Bulgaria
Wrestlers at the 1992 Summer Olympics
People from Smolyan